Arne Winsnes (born 27 July 1974) is a retired Norwegian football midfielder.

He came through the junior ranks of Rosenborg BK. In 1995 he made his league debut, only featuring in the 9–1 thrashing of Ham Kam, but also featured in the victorious 1995 Norwegian Football Cup Final. He went on to second-tier Strindheim and Byåsen, and eventually performed so well that he secured a 1999 transfer back to Rosenborg. In the summer of 2000 he went to a season-and-a-half loan to Byåsen, joining them permanently thereafter. He later moved from Trondheim and featured for lowly Fagerborg.

References

1974 births
Living people
Footballers from Trondheim
Norwegian footballers
Rosenborg BK players
Strindheim IL players
Byåsen Toppfotball players
Eliteserien players
Norwegian First Division players
Association football midfielders